John of Cottereau, baron of Jauche, sometimes Van Coutereau Lord of Assche (died 17 September 1561), was the lord mayor of the City of Brussels in 1534.

Family and Descendants 

He was born as the only son of John I of Cottereau, Baron of Jauche and Margueritte, Lady of Assche. He married in 1556 a second time to the lady in waiting of Mary of Hungria: Catherine de Brandenbourg, Lady of Steenockerzeel. He was buried in the family mausoleum of the church of Asse with his spouse.

Children:
 John III de Cottereau, died without issue
 Guillaume I de Cottereau, 1st Marquess of Assche
 Philipp de Cottereau
 Valeria de Cottereau
Their descendants belong to the Belgian nobility.

Career 
On 29 April 1556, John received by Royal decree the right of Lord Baron of Jauche. He was member of the Seven Noble Houses of Brussels, and had an important career in the Duchy of Brabant.

See also 
Westmalle Castle

References 

1561 deaths
Mayors of the City of Brussels
Flemish nobility
Seven Noble Houses of Brussels